А-080-752 is a project by JSC Alekseyev Central Hydrofoil Design Bureau for a passenger ekranoplan with a maximum takeoff weight of 100 metric tons and a payload of 20 metric tons over 5000 km.

References

Ekranoplans
Proposed aircraft of Russia